Estudiantes Football Club was a professional football club located in San Salvador, El Salvador that participated in Segunda División de Fútbol Salvadoreño from 2007 to 2008. The club was founded in 1905 in Argentina.

The club played its home games at Estadio Cuscatlán, which is the largest stadium in El Salvador.

History
Estudiantes was a team founded by Fundación Educando a un Salvadoreño, otherwise known as FESA. It was created with the hope of helping develop young players and FESA scholarship holders into professional footballers. After only one season, Estudiantes sold their spot in the Segunda División to Once Lobos. They have since ceased operations.

Turín FESA
FESA then joined forces with Turín FC to form Turín FESA F.C.

Squad

Goalkeepers
  Agustín Silva
  Hilario Bernardo Navarro
  Nahuel Hernán Losada

Head coaches
 Raúl Antonio García (Clausura 2007-Apertura 2008)

Home stadium
 Estadio Cuscatlán

Year-by-year

References

Association football clubs established in 2007
Defunct football clubs in El Salvador
Association football clubs disestablished in 2008
2007 establishments in El Salvador
2008 disestablishments in El Salvador